Athletics at the 2010 Asian Para Games were held in Aoti Main Stadium from December 14 to December 19. There were 120 gold medals in this sport.

Classification
Athletes are given a classification depending on the type and extent of their disability. The classification system allows athletes to compete against others with a similar level of function.

The athletics classifications are:
11–13: Blind athletes
32–38: Athletes with cerebral palsy 
40: Les Autres (others) (including people with dwarfism)
42–46: Amputees
51–58: Athletes with a spinal cord disability

The class numbers are given prefixes  of "T", "F" and "P" for track, field and pentathlon events, respectively.

Medal summary

Medal table

Men's events

Women's events

External links
2010 Asian Para Games - Official Website 

2010 Asian Para Games events
Asian Para Games
2010 Asian Para Games
2010 Asian Para Games